The 1953–54 Soviet Championship League season was the eighth season of the Soviet Championship League, the top level of ice hockey in the Soviet Union. Nine teams participated in the league, and Dynamo Moscow won the championship.

Standings

External links
Season on hockeystars.ru

1953–54 in Soviet ice hockey
Soviet League seasons
Soviet sport